Hiraman Bhikabhai Khoskar is an Indian politician. He was elected as a Member of the Maharashtra Legislative Assembly for Igatpuri constituency. He received 31555 votes as belong to the Indian National Congress party.

References 

Indian National Congress politicians
Living people
Year of birth missing (living people)